Spunk.nl is a Dutch e-zine representing Dutch youth culture. The e-zine has weekly 150.000 visitors  and had an alliance with the daily evening newspaper NRC Handelsblad.

References

External links
Spunk Homepage

Dutch-language websites
Dutch news websites
Zines